Juuso Pärssinen (born 1 February 2001) is a Finnish professional ice hockey forward who is currently playing for the Nashville Predators of the National Hockey League (NHL). Pärssinen was selected by the Predators in the seventh round, 210th overall, in the 2019 NHL Entry Draft.

Playing career
Pärssinen first played in his native Finland within the junior program of the HC TPS. He made his professional debut with TPS in the Liiga as a 17-year-old during the 2018–19 season. Showing potential, he was a last round selection, 210th overall, by the Nashville Predators in the 2019 NHL Entry Draft.

Pärssinen played his first full season in the Liiga during the 2020–21 season. Having exclusively played with TPS in Finland, Pärssinen was selected as an alternate captain despite his young age and contributed with a team leading 34 assists and posting 42 points through 55 regular season games. He topped the league in scoring among under-21 players and in the post-season he helped TPS by contributing with 8 points in 13 games, before falling to a 3-1 finals defeat to Lukko.

On 1 June 2021, Pärssinen was signed to a three-year, entry-level contract with draft club, the Nashville Predators. Loaned by the Predators back to TPS for the ensuing 2021–22 season, he continued his development despite suffering an injury by amassing 32 points through 41 regular season games. He helped TPS return to the Liiga finals, posting a career best 12 points in 18 games before suffering a 1–4 series defeat to Tappara.

At the conclusion of his season with TPS, Pärssinen embarked on his North American career in joining the Predators AHL affiliate, the Milwaukee Admirals, for their Calder Cup playoffs campaign on 5 May 2022, finishing with 1 goal and 3 points through 9 games.

After attending the Predators 2022 training camp, Pärssinen was assigned to begin the  season with the Admirals. In scoring at almost a point-per-game pace with 9 in 10, helping the Admirals to first in its division, Pärssinen received his first recall to the Predators on 12 November 2022. He made his NHL debut the same day, instantly recording his first NHL goal to help the Predators to a 2–1 victory over the New York Rangers at Bridgestone Arena. Inserted into the Predators scoring lines, Pärssinen responded with his first multi-goal and 3 points game in just his third appearance, helping Nashville to a 5–4 victory over the New York Islanders on 17 November 2022.

Personal life
Pärssinen is the son of Timo Pärssinen who played professionally from 1994 to 2015. He enjoyed a lengthy European career and briefly played in the NHL with the Mighty Ducks of Anaheim during the 2000–01 season.

He is the eldest of four brothers, Jiri, Julius and Jesse, who all play hockey. His brother, Jiri, is currently under contract with HPK of the Liiga.

Career statistics

Regular Season and Playoffs

International

References

External links

2001 births
Living people
Finnish ice hockey right wingers
Milwaukee Admirals players
Nashville Predators draft picks
Nashville Predators players
HC TPS players